David Ovide L'Espérance (January 6, 1864 – August 31, 1941) was a manufacturer and political figure in Quebec. He represented Montmagny in the House of Commons of Canada from 1911 to 1916 as a Conservative. L'Espérance sat for Gulf division in the Senate of Canada from 1917 to 1941.

He was born in Montmagny, Canada East, the son of Edouard L'Espérance. In 1888, he married Clara Dionne. L'Espérance was president of the Grande Allée Apartments Company, L'Évenement Publishing Company, the Amable Bélanger Manufacturing Company, the General Car and Machinery Works in Montmagny and the Quebec Exposition Board. L'Espérance was also chairman of the Harbour Commission of Quebec. He was an unsuccessful candidate for a seat in the House of Commons in 1908. L'Espérance resigned his seat in the House of Commons in 1916 upon his appointment to the Senate. He died in office at the age of 77.

Electoral record

References 

Members of the House of Commons of Canada from Quebec
Conservative Party of Canada (1867–1942) MPs
Canadian senators from Quebec
1864 births
1941 deaths